Getor Jagatpura Railway Station is a railway station in Jaipur district, Rajasthan. Its code is GTJT. It serves Jagatpura area of Jaipur city.

Major trains 
Some of the important trains that run from Getor Jagatpura are:

 Jaipur–Hisar Passenger (unreserved)
 Ajmer–Chandigarh Garib Rath Express
 Ajmer–Amritsar Express (via Firozpur)
 Amritsar–Ajmer Express (via Dhuri)
 Agra Fort–Ajmer Intercity Express
 Ala Hazrat Express (via Bhildi)
 Jaipur–Alwar Express
 Ala Hazrat Express (via Ahmedabad)
 Mathura–Jaipur Passenger (unreserved)

FACILITY AVAILABLE

 amul stall
 ticket vending machine in reservation office near platform 2
 autostand outside platform 1
 RPF substation

See also

 Jaipur district
 Durgapura railway station
 Gandhinagar Jaipur railway station
 Jaipur Junction railway station

References

Railway stations in Jaipur
Railway stations in Jaipur district
Jaipur railway division